The Alfred Budge House, in Paris, Idaho, located at N. 1st, West at W. 1st, North, is a historic house that was built in 1880.  It was renovated to include Second Empire styling, including a mansard roof, at a later date. The house has a complex design with three major sections and multiple smaller ones; while the mansard roof tops the main section, the house has eight roof components in total. It is listed on the U.S. National Register of Historic Places;  the listing included six contributing buildings.

It is significant in part as the home of prominent Idahoan Alfred Budge. Budge served as a justice of the Idaho Supreme Court. The house is one of four Paris residences related to the Budge family which are listed on the National Register.

See also 
Budge Cottage, also NRHP-listed in Paris
Julia Budge House, also NRHP-listed in Paris
Taft Budge Bungalow, also NRHP-listed in Paris

References 

Houses on the National Register of Historic Places in Idaho
Second Empire architecture in Idaho
Houses completed in 1880
Houses in Bear Lake County, Idaho
National Register of Historic Places in Bear Lake County, Idaho
Buildings with mansard roofs